Matthew Terry Clark (born December 10, 1986) is an American former professional baseball first baseman and outfielder. He played for the Milwaukee Brewers of Major League Baseball (MLB) and the Chunichi Dragons and Orix Buffaloes (NPB). Prior to beginning his professional career, he played college baseball at UC Santa Barbara and Louisiana State University. Clark also competed for the United States national baseball team and the Mexico national baseball team.

Amateur career 
Clark attended Etiwanda High School in Rancho Cucamonga, California.  It was announced on November 18, 2004 that Clark had signed with the UC Santa Barbara Gauchos baseball team and enrolled at the University of California, Santa Barbara.  Clark played in 44 games as a true freshman and hit 2 home runs for the Gauchos. He left Santa Barbara after his freshman year and continued his collegiate career at Riverside Community College, where he was named a Junior college First-Team All-American in 2007. Clark was drafted by the Pittsburgh Pirates in the 28th round (848th overall) of the 2007 Major League Baseball (MLB) Draft, but did not sign. After the 2007 season, he played collegiate summer baseball with the Cotuit Kettleers of the Cape Cod Baseball League.

Clark transferred to Louisiana State University (LSU), where he played for the LSU Tigers baseball team in the Southeastern Conference of the National Collegiate Athletic Association's (NCAA) Division I in 2008. As a junior, his 28 home runs tied Gordon Beckham for most in NCAA's Division I.

Professional career

San Diego Padres
The San Diego Padres selected Clark in the 12th round (375th overall) of the 2008 MLB draft, and Clark signed with the Padres. He began his professional career with the Eugene Emeralds of the Class-A Short Season Northwest League in 2008, batting .279/.384/.443 in 140 at bats.

In 2009, he played for the Fort Wayne TinCaps of the Class-A Midwest League and the Lake Elsinore Storm of the Class-A Advanced California League. He finished the 2009 season batting .279/.360/.504 with 101 runs batted in (RBIs) and 134 strikeouts in 502 at bats at Fort Wayne and Lake Elsinore, one of 15 minor league baseball players to have at least 100 RBIs that season.

He played for the San Antonio Missions of the Class-AA Texas League in 2010 (batting .269/.339/.485 with 28 home runs (2nd in the Texas League) and 97 RBIs (2nd) in 499 at bats while leading the league with 146 strikeouts). He then played for the Tucson Padres of the Class-AAA Pacific Coast League in 2011 (batting .292/.363/.498 with 23 home runs and 83 RBIs and 116 strikeouts in 462 at bats).

The Padres invited Clark to spring training in 2012. In 2012 with Tucson he batted .290/.367/.506 with 22 home runs (6th in the league) and 77 RBIs (10th) as he struck out 113 times (3rd) in 445 at bats. He was released from the organization on January 8, 2013.

Chunichi Dragons
Clark played with the Chunichi Dragons of Nippon Professional Baseball (NPB) for the 2013 season. He batted .238/.328/.457 with 25 home runs (4th in the league) and 70 RBIs (7th) as he struck out 130 times (leading the league) in 407 at bats.

New York Mets
On January 31, 2014, Clark signed a minor-league contract with the New York Mets that included an invitation to spring training. He appeared in 67 games for the Double-A Binghamton Mets, batting .297/.380/.498 with 10 home runs and 46 RBIs in 219 at bats, before he was released on June 25, 2014.

Milwaukee Brewers

On July 4, 2014, Clark signed a minor-league contract with the Milwaukee Brewers. Playing for AAA Nashville, he batted .313/.371/.605 with 16 home runs and 37 RBIs in 195 at bats. Clark was called up to the Brewers MLB roster in September 2014. He hit his first MLB RBI then later hit his first MLB home run on September 10, 2014 at home against the Miami Marlins. The home run extended the Brewers' lead over the Marlins to 3-1 in the bottom of the 7th inning in a game with potential playoff implications. In 27 at bats with the Brewers he hit .185/.226/.519.

Clark spent the 2015 season with the Triple-A Colorado Springs Sky Sox, batting .291/.367/.492 with 34 doubles (8th in the Pacific Coast League), 20 home runs, and 77 RBIs in 478 at bats. He elected free agency on November 6, 2015.

Chicago Cubs
On February 26, 2016, Clark signed a minor league deal with the Chicago Cubs with an invite to spring training for the season. He was released on March 26.

Vaqueros Laguna
Clark signed with the Vaqueros Laguna of the Mexican Baseball League on April 28, 2016. After 15 at bats, he was released on May 3, 2016.

Orix Buffaloes
He returned to NPB with the Orix Buffaloes on May 12, 2016. After 29 at bats, he became a free agent after the 2016 season.

Mexican League (2017–2021)
On February 28, 2017, Clark signed with the Acereros de Monclova of the Mexican Baseball League. On April 14, 2018, Clark was traded to the Pericos de Puebla of the Mexican Baseball League. Clark was then traded to the Tecolotes de los Dos Laredos on June 11, 2018. On August 15, 2018, Clark was loaned to the Leones de Yucatán for the remainder of the 2018 season. Between three teams in the Mexican League, in 2018 he batted .278/.382/.474 with 12 home runs and 47 RBIs in 266 at bats.

After electing free agency following the season, he signed with the Bravos de León on March 5, 2019. In 2019 with the team he batted .316/.404/.681 (5th in the Mexican League) with 27 home runs and 87 RBIs in 285 at bats. Clark did not play in a game in 2020 due to the cancellation of the Mexican League season because of the COVID-19 pandemic.

On February 2, 2021, Clark was traded to the Sultanes de Monterrey along with Norman Elenes and Omar Renteria in exchange for Chris Roberson and Felix Perez. In 15 games with the team, he batted .220/.375/.240 with 11 hits and 3 RBIs in 64 at bats. 

On June 14, 2021, Clark was traded back to the Bravos de León in exchange for IF Carlos Álvarez. He finished the season with a .299/.388/.576 line, belting 13 home runs and driving in 43 runs over 45 games.  

On March 25, 2022, Clark announced his retirement from professional baseball.

International career
Clark played for the United States national baseball team in the 2011 Baseball World Cup and the 2011 Pan American Games, winning the silver medal.

In 2019, he was on the Mexico national baseball team in the 2019 WBSC Premier 12, when he hit a home run in a game against the United States bringing home the bronze medal, 3-2. It qualified him for consideration for a national team spot in the 2020 Olympic Games but he was not selected.

Personal life 
Clark's father, Terry Clark, played in MLB. Clark is married to Julia Morales.

See also 
 List of second-generation Major League Baseball players

References

External links 

UC Santa Barbara player profile

1986 births
Living people
Acereros de Monclova players
Águilas de Mexicali players
American baseball players of Mexican descent
American expatriate baseball players in Japan
American expatriate baseball players in Mexico
Baseball players at the 2011 Pan American Games
Baseball players from California
Binghamton Mets players
Bravos de León players
Bravos de Margarita players
American expatriate baseball players in Venezuela
Chunichi Dragons players
Colorado Springs Sky Sox players
Cotuit Kettleers players
Eugene Emeralds players
Fort Wayne TinCaps players
Gigantes del Cibao players
Lake Elsinore Storm players
Leones de Yucatán players
LSU Tigers baseball players
Major League Baseball first basemen
Mexican League baseball first basemen
Milwaukee Brewers players
Nashville Sounds players
Nippon Professional Baseball first basemen
Orix Buffaloes players
Pan American Games medalists in baseball
Pan American Games silver medalists for the United States
Sportspeople from West Covina, California
Pericos de Puebla players
San Antonio Missions players
Sultanes de Monterrey players
Tecolotes de los Dos Laredos players
Toros del Este players
American expatriate baseball players in the Dominican Republic
Tucson Padres players
UC Santa Barbara Gauchos baseball players
United States national baseball team players
Vaqueros Laguna players
Venados de Mazatlán players
2019 WBSC Premier12 players
People from Rancho Cucamonga, California
Sportspeople from San Bernardino County, California
Medalists at the 2011 Pan American Games